HDMS may refer to:
 His/Her Danish Majesty's Ship (in Danish, KDM), ship prefix for Denmark's Royal Danish Navy
 Hexamethyldisilazane, chemical reagent